Australia-Asia Literary Award (AALA) was an initiative of the Government of Western Australia Department of Culture and the Arts. It was Australia's richest literary prize, with a purse of A$110,000. The award was established in 2007 and the first and only winner was announced in November 2008, from entries published in 2007. In 2010 it was announced the award would be discontinued, with resources merged with the Western Australian Premier's Book Awards (PBA). "The AALA will be discontinued immediately so we can free up some of those funds for an improved Premier’s Book Awards." On 15 February 2010, the PBA began accepting for entry books published in 2008 and 2009 for the 2010 PBA.

2008
Winner announced in November 2008 for books published in 2007.

Winner
David Malouf, The Complete Stories 

Shortlist
 Michelle de Kretser, The Lost Dog
 Mohsin Hamid, The Reluctant Fundamentalist
 David Malouf, The Complete Stories
 Ceridwen Dovey, Blood Kin
 Janette Turner Hospital, Orpheus Lost

References 

Australian literary awards
Asian literary awards
Awards established in 2007
Awards disestablished in 2010
2007 establishments in Australia
2010 disestablishments in Australia